Walking on Air is a 1936 American comedy film starring Gene Raymond and Ann Sothern, with a supporting cast which includes Jessie Ralph and Henry Stephenson.  It was directed by Joseph Santley using a screenplay by Bert Kalmar, Harry Ruby, Viola Brothers Shore, and Rian James, based on the short story, "Count Pete", written by Francis M. Cockrell. Produced by RKO Radio Pictures, they released the film on September 11, 1936.

Plot summary

Cast
 Gene Raymond as Pete Quinlan, aka Count Pierre Louis de Marsac
 Ann Sothern as Kit Bennett
 Jessie Ralph as Evelyn Bennett
 Henry Stephenson as Mr. Horace Bennett
 George Meeker as Tom Quinlan
 Gordon Jones as Joe
 Maxine Jennings as Flo Quinlan
 Alan Curtis as Fred Randolph
 Anita Colby as Ex-Mrs. Fred Randolph
 Patricia Wilder as KARB Receptionist

References

External links
 
 
 
 

1936 comedy films
1936 films
American comedy films
Films directed by Joseph Santley
Films scored by Nathaniel Shilkret
American black-and-white films
RKO Pictures films
1930s American films